Gene Pitney's Big Sixteen, Volume Two is American singer Gene Pitney's tenth album, released on the Musicor label in the United States in 1965. The album was released as Gene Pitney's More Big Sixteen on the Stateside label in the United Kingdom.

The compilation album featured Pitney's two most recent hit singles - "It Hurts to Be in Love" and "I'm Gonna Be Strong" - together with a range of lesser hits and album-only tracks from earlier releases and one new track, "Fool Killer".

Track listing

Side 1
"It Hurts to Be in Love" (Howard Greenfield, Helen Miller) – 2:33 (from It Hurts To Be In Love)
"Oh Annie Oh" (Gary Jackson) – 2:34 (from Gene Pitney Meets the Fair Young Ladies of Folkland)
"Today's Teardrops" (Gene Pitney, Aaron Schroeder) – 1:55 (from The Many Sides of Gene Pitney)
"Fool Killer" (Burt Bacharach, Hal David) – 3:22 (non-single LP debut)
"Laurie" (Don Gohman, Hal Hackady) – 2:22 (from Gene Pitney Meets the Fair Young Ladies of Folkland)
"Hawaii" (Bob Brass, Al Kooper, Irwin Levine) – 2:07 (from It Hurts To Be In Love)
"Little Betty Falling Star" (Burt Bacharach, Bob Hilliard) – 2:25 (from Only Love Can Break a Heart)
"Brandy Is My True Love's Name" (Atra Baer, Martin Kalmanoff) – 2:59 (from Gene Pitney Meets the Fair Young Ladies of Folkland)

Side 2
"I'm Gonna Be Strong" (Barry Mann, Cynthia Weil) – 2:14 (from It Hurts To Be In Love)
"Hello Mary Lou" (Pitney) – 2:13 (from The Many Sides of Gene Pitney)
"I Love You More Today" (Van McCoy) – 2:18 (from It Hurts To Be In Love)
"Half the Laughter, Twice the Tears" (Al Cleveland, Carl Spencer) – 2:11 (from Blue Gene)
"Lyda Sue, Wha'dya Do?" (Ben Raleigh, Mark Barkan) – 1:58 (from Gene Pitney Meets the Fair Young Ladies of Folkland)
"Not Responsible" (Raleigh, Barkan) – 2:31 (from Gene Pitney Sings Just for You)
"Every Breath I Take" (Gerry Goffin, Carole King) – 2:46 (from The Many Sides of Gene Pitney)
"I Laughed So Hard I Cried" (Ann Orlowski, Schroeder) – 2:16 (from The Many Sides of Gene Pitney)

References

1965 albums
Gene Pitney albums
Musicor Records albums